This article lists players who have recently captained the Carlow county hurling team in the Christy Ring Cup, the Leinster Senior Hurling Championship and the All-Ireland Senior Hurling Championship.

List of captains

References

+Captains
Hurlers
Carlow